Cúram Software was an Irish software company headquartered in Dublin, Ireland with offices in Australia, Germany, India, the United Kingdom and the United States.  The company produces Social Enterprise Management (SEM) software and offers consulting services, certification, and training. Their name is an Irish word for "Care and Protection". The company was founded in 1990.

John Hearne, co-founded Cúram, which was initially called IT Design, in 1990 with Ronan Rooney, whom he worked with at Apple Computer. It was renamed to Cúram Software in 2003.

Their main software product was the Cúram Business Application Suite.  This administrative software packages that allowed welfare and unemployment agencies to manage the programs they administer.  The company's products found government buyers in a number of U.S. states, Canadian Provinces, Australia, New Zealand, Germany, Guernsey, UK, etc.  According to Federal Computer Week, purchasers of the software, both in the US and internationally found that by integrating information technology systems, their government would save time and money; reduce waste, fraud and abuse; improve data accuracy; and provide better assistance to individuals and families in a holistic manner.

It was purchased by IBM in December 2011. The purchase of Cúram was part of the investments IBM is making to support the convergence of health and human services issues and gives healthcare organizations the ability to focus on the “whole individual” when addressing the causes of health and disease.  The commitment is “unprecedented” in that it allows IBM customers to implement strategies that improve the health of the population as well as the patient experience while also managing the growth of costs.  IBM's acquisition of Cúram brought enterprise capabilities into IBM's broader Smarter Care strategy.  At the time of acquisition, IBM's software division capabilities expanded significantly when the almost 300 local Cúram staff were added to the 1,000 IBM staff already working on software as part of the Smarter Care offerings. These capabilities resulted in Cúram being chosen as a key component for New York State's Medicaid redesign program.

John Hearne and Ronan Rooney remained with IBM until early 2016, when IBM formed the new IBM Watson Health division, and Cúram software became a part of the offerings in government health and human services.

A system deployed by Cúram for Minnesota health insurance exchange MNsure caused widely reported problems in 2013, including duplicate applications, delayed applications and applicants losing employment being left with no coverage at all for a month or more.

In March, 2014 MNsure's interim CEO Scott Leitz reported that things are working better due to 100 new staff members at its overloaded call center and fewer website errors.  According to Leitz, “It’s stable and it is in much better shape than it was in the fall and it’s the best place for people to go.” 

In 2014, an IBM/Cúram system deployed for the Ministry of Community and Social Services (Ontario) welfare programme "Ontario Works" caused thousands of duplicate payments, while not paying many welfare recipients at all. Some were unable to pay for rent or electricity, in some cases leading to their eviction.

On Tuesday, April 21, 2015 - Ontario Public Service Employees Union (OPSEU) made a publication highlighting their serious concerns over Cúram implementation and the negative impact to their front-line workers.

In April, 2016 the Government of Ontario awarded IBM a $32M contract despite 18 months of problems associated with the software responsible for tracking Ontarians on social assistance.

Cúram software is still being used today in projects around the world. In Denmark and Catalonia, Spain, the healthcare sector is using Cúram intended to cut re-admissions and improve care. In Florida, the South Florida Behavioral Network  is using the software to improve care coordination, preventing gaps in care for people suffering from mental illnesses.

It is still being used to connect benefits administrators, healthcare agencies, clinicians and case managers across more than 40 healthcare and service providers.

References

External links 
Cúram Software home page
Smarter Cities
Article on use of Cúram products by New Zealand Government from The Dominion Post
Cúram Software Utah state implementation featured in Government Technology magazine annual list of 'Doers, Dreamers and Drivers
Story in Government Technology on use of Cúram products being used to simplify social services in Indiana
HPtoday announced a new global agreement
Ontario government, IBM smacked for bungled software project
Gov. Hutchinson Tells DHS To Pause Over-Budget Medicaid Computer System
Systems failure - Our view: We don't excuse state officials for oversight of the health exchange, but IBM also needs to be held to public account for its faulty software
EXCLUSIVE: IBM wins $32M Ontario government contract despite delivering problem-riddled software
SAMS: More Than A "Glitch"

Software companies of Ireland